The Party of Greek Hunters (KEK), is a minor Greek political party that advocates the rights of hunters. It is led by Giorgos Tsagkanelias.

Electoral results

External links
Party website

Conservative parties in Greece
Recreational political parties
Hunting organizations
Political parties established in 1990
1990 establishments in Greece